Zun Than Sin (born 26 June 1995) is a Burmese model, musician, and beauty pageant titleholder who was crowned Miss Universe Myanmar 2017 and represented Myanmar at the Miss Universe 2017 pageant.

Early life 
Zun was born and raised in Yangon to an ethnic Rakhine family. Her father is a head doctor from Yangon Ear Nose & Throat Hospital, while her mother is a housewife.

Education 
Zun graduated with double degrees in Burmese Literature and Dramatic Arts from National University of Arts and Culture in Yangon.

Pageantry

Miss Universe Myanmar
Having previously competed in beauty pageants before, she was crowned as Miss Universe Myanmar 2017 on October 6, 2016, by outgoing titleholder Htet Htet Htun. She represented Myanmar at Miss Universe 2017.

Miss Universe 2017
She competed at Miss Universe 2017 but Unplaced.

Filmography

Television series
Yadanarbon (2017)

References

External links
missuniversemyanmar.com

1996 births
Living people
Miss Universe 2017 contestants
People from Yangon
Miss Universe Myanmar winners
University of Yangon alumni
Burmese beauty pageant winners
Burmese people of Rakhine descent